Ophioglossum pusillum is a species of fern in the family Ophioglossaceae known by the common name northern adder's tongue.

It is native to northern North America, where it is widespread in moist areas such as marshes, fens, and meadows. It is found from northern California through Alaska on the west, and from central Appalachia through the northern Great Plains and the Great Lakes regions, across the Northeastern United States and Eastern Canada.

Description
Ophioglossum pusillum is a small, inconspicuous, fleshy perennial plant growing from a caudex no more than 3 centimeters wide. It produces one leaf per year.

The leaf is divided into a thin, pale green blade-shaped part, which is sterile, and a fertile stalk lined with two rows of sporangia.

External links
USDA Plants Profile of Ophioglossum pusillum
Jepson Manual Treatment for Ophioglossum pusillum
Flora of North America: Ophioglossum pusillum
Ophioglossum pusillum — U.C. Photo gallery

pusillum
Ferns of the Americas
Taxa named by Constantine Samuel Rafinesque